Damienus Reverson (born 18 October 2003) is a Dutch footballer who plays for Jong AZ.

Career
Reverson started with AVV Zeeburgia in his native Amsterdam but moved to the AZ Alkmaar academy to play age group football from
under-12 level. In the summer of 2021 Reverson signed his first professional contract with AZ to keep him with the club until the end of the 2022-23 season, plus the option of an extra season was included.

Reverson made his Eerste Divisie debut for Jong AZ on the 18 March 2022, away at Jong FC Utrecht. He struck his first goal in the Eerste Divisie on 12 August 2012 against Helmond Sport in a 3-1 away victory at the Stadion De Braak.

References

External links
 

Living people
2003 births
Dutch footballers
Eerste Divisie players
Jong AZ players
Association football midfielders
Footballers from Amsterdam